Ibra  is an airport serving Ibra, a town in the Ash Sharqiyah North Governorate of Oman.

See also
Transport in Oman
List of airports in Oman

References

External links
 OurAirports - Ibra Airport
 OpenStreetMap - Ibra

Airports in Oman